The 2005 Arab Athletics Championships was the fourteenth edition of the international athletics competition between Arab countries which took place in Radès/Tunis, Tunisia from 12–15 September.

Medal summary

Men

Women

Medal table

Overall

Men

Women

References

 Revue "Al Batal Al Arabi":N°:61, Site de l'Union arabe d'athlétisme, 
 Championnats arabes, Radès (Tunisie) 15-18/9. Africa Athle. Retrieved on 2013-11-02.
Arab Championships, Final Day. IAAF (2005-09-19). Retrieved on 2013-11-03.

Arab Athletics Championships
International athletics competitions hosted by Tunisia
Sport in Tunis
Arab Athletics Championships
Arab Athletics Championships
21st century in Tunis
Sports competitions in Radès
21st century in Radès